Nabin K Bhattarai (born March 14, 1972) is a Nepali singer, songwriter, and composer.

Education

Nabin Bhattarai studied at Budhanilkantha School in Kathmandu, Nepal. After his school he briefly joined Nepal Science campus for his ISC. He dropped the ISC and later joined Music Department of Kathmandu University in Bhaktapur. He is trained in eastern classical music by legendary Nararaj Dhakal & then by Prabhuraj Dhakal . He has completed Bachelors in ethnomusicology.

Musical career

Nabin K Bhattarai started his musical career in 1990 with the band "The Steel Wheels" as the vocalist and rhythm guitarist for the band. After the band disbanded, he pursued a solo career. He was able to capture the attention of many Nepali music-lovers with his first released song Aankhama Timilai from the album Raharai Raharma which instantly made him a household name in Nepal. After the huge success of his first album, he has recorded eleven more albums from 1990 till date. His most recent album is Slok. Nabin K Bhattarai is considered to be the first real pop-star and unarguably one of the greatest pop singers of the country with an enormous fan following.

He has won the Sajha Smriti Award for Best Male Vocalist on two occasions, first for Preetka Geet and then for Aankhama Timilai. He also won Album of the Year Award for Raharai Raharama. He further won the Shikhar Hits FM Music Awards 2054 (1997) on Best Male Vocal category for his hit single Sanjhapakha. He has also won the Chhinnalata Award, and at that time he was the youngest artist to receive that award. His album Aabhash is unarguably one of the most popular Nepali music album in the country's contemporary musical history. He also won Hits FM Music Awards 2060 (2003) for his sixth album Nabin. He has also won several other awards and recognition afterwards. Some of his notable hits include Sanjhapakha', Timilai Ma Dobatoma, Timile Herda Kasailai, Timilai Bhetne, Chaina Joona', Yaad Le Timro and many others.  As of 2011, he had been seen a lot in social works.

Musical style
Most of Nabin K Bhattarai's earlier songs have a melodic pop style to them, depicting the loneliness of a young lover. A beautiful flavor of Eastern classical raag is the beauty of his some of the initial compositions. While his first four albums Raharai Raharma, Aabhas, Smriti, Samjhana, and Samarpan had the more melodic style, he began experimenting around his  sixth album, Nabin. Many of his compositions after "Nabin" mostly include the elements of rock in them, which was positively received by the Nepali audience. In all his successive albums, he has tried to add a new musical element and contribute something different to the Nepali music industry. His song Ali Alikati Pida from the album G-Major was critically acclaimed by many for its folk and pop mix and the affluent use of musical instruments. His collaborations with Rajan Raj Shiwakoti are highly appreciated by the audience. He is known as the 'king of Nepali Pop'.

Albums
Raharai Raharma
Aavash
Smriti
Samjhana
Samarpan
Nabin
The Blue
Smriti Re-loaded
G-Major
Nakshatra
Kathmandu
Slok 
जिन्दगी ( with Steel Wheels Band, before starting solo career)

References

1972 births
Living people
21st-century Nepalese male singers
20th-century Nepalese male singers
Nepalese singer-songwriters
Musicians from Kathmandu
Nepalese playback singers